Patrick James Kearney (born 1970) is a Canadian classical guitarist. He is known for his virtuosic and Romantic interpretations of both contemporary and canonical guitar music. He studied at the École Normale de Musique de Paris under Rafael Andia and Alberto Ponce.

He is director of the Montreal International Classical Guitar Festival and Competition.

He currently teaches classical guitar performance at Concordia University and at Vanier College in Montreal, in the Canadian province of Quebec.

Discography
Bouquet (1997), La Flame LF9701CD
Stringendo (2001), Daminus Records D991
Diabolico (2004), La Flame LF0401
Impressions (2009), ATMA Classique Records ACD22629

External links
Impressions Page
Homepage
Atma Classique Record Label

1970 births
Canadian classical guitarists
Canadian male guitarists
Living people
21st-century Canadian guitarists
21st-century Canadian male musicians